Crystal City is a city in and the county seat of Zavala County, Texas, United States. The population was 6,354 at the 2020 census. It was settled as a farming and ranching community and was a major railroad stop being  from San Antonio. Spinach became a major crop and the city has promoted itself as "Spinach Capital of the World." During World War II, a large internment camp was located here. The town is also noteworthy in the history of Mexican American political self-determination for the founding of the La Raza Unida Party.

History

Farming, ranching, railroad

Crystal City was originally settled by American farmers and ranchers producing cattle and various crops.

The successful production of spinach evolved into a dominant industry. By March 26, 1937, the growers had erected a statue of the cartoon character Popeye in the town because his reliance on spinach for strength led to greater popularity for the vegetable, which had become a staple cash crop of the local economy. Early in its history, the area known as the "Winter Garden District" was deemed the "Spinach Capital of the World" (a title contested by Alma, Arkansas). The first Spinach Festival was held in 1936. It was put on hold during World War II and later years. The festival  resumed in 1982. The Spinach Festival is traditionally held on the second weekend in November, and draws former residents (many of them former migrant farm workers) from Michigan, Wisconsin, Minnesota, California, Washington, and beyond.

Internment camp

During World War II, Crystal City was home to a World War II internment camp which housed American civilians of German, Japanese, and Italian ancestry.

Political activism
With the stream of refugees fleeing the Mexican Revolution of 1910, and later added to by Mexican migrant workers lured by the local spinach industry, the demographics of the small rural city began to shift over the years since its 1910 incorporation, due to its proximity to the U.S./Mexico border. By 1963, Crystal City experienced a tumultuous Mexican American electoral victory, as the swiftly emerging Mexican American majority elected fellow Mexican Americans to the city council, led by Juan Cornejo, a local representative of the Teamsters Union at the Del Monte cannery in Crystal City. The newly elected all Mexican American city council, and the succeeding administration, had trouble governing the city because of political factions among the new officials.  Cornejo was selected mayor from among the five new council members. His quest for control of the city government eventually led to his loss of political support. Although these five elected officials known as "Los Cinco" only held office for two years, many consider this moment the "spark" or starting point of what became known as the Chicano movement.  A new group made up of both Anglos and Mexican Americans, the Citizens Association Serving All Americans, announced its plans to run candidates for countywide offices in 1964, and won.

In 1969, it was no longer allowed for Mexican Americans to speak Spanish in school, and there were no more classes or lessons on Mexican history, culture, or literature, despite the fact that Mexican Americans were in the majority in Crystal City.

Chicano School Walkouts
Mexican Americans were and continue to be the majority of the population of Crystal City. In the late 1960s, over half of these were migrant farmers who would take their children out of school in the spring and sometimes would not return from the migrant circuit until the fall semester had already begun. During the summer interim, government officials and school board members would pass rules and regulations to maintain control of the absentee population. However, not just in these positions of power  was a lack of Mexican Americans noticeable. A faculty committee of the local high school ruled that only one Mexican American cheerleader was allowed and the rest had to be Anglo. In the 1969 school year, students were outraged when two cheerleading spots became vacant, but no Mexican American students were allowed to fill the spots because one Mexican American cheerleader was already on the team. That year, the school board also required that any candidate for cheerleader had to have at least one parent who graduated from the high school. When Mexican American students complained to the superintendent, a new rule was created that stated that there were to be three Mexican American cheerleaders and three Anglo cheerleaders. The Anglo parents complained that the superintendent was "caving in" to the Mexican American students, which resulted in the school board nullifying the superintendent's solution and creating a new resolution stating that any future unrest among the students would be met with expulsion.

Student leaders took their concerns to the school board, who refused to hear their demands, which included the "hiring of more Hispanic teachers and counselors; more classes to challenge students and fewer shop and home economics electives; bilingual-bicultural education at the elementary and secondary levels; Mexican American studies classes to reflect the contributions made by Latinos; and the edition of a student representative to the school board."

After the school board refused to hear their demands, the students staged a walkout on December 9, 1969. Students continued to join each day until the number of students walking the picket line exceeded 2,000. When elementary and junior high students began to join the walkout, the Texas Education Agency (TEA) sent negotiators to attempt to try to get the students back in school. The TEA recommended closing schools early for the Christmas holidays, but the schoolboard nixed this idea.

Texas Senator Ralph Yarborough invited three student leaders to come to Washington, DC, to discuss discrimination in their schools. These students also met with Senator Edward Kennedy and Senator George McGovern, who notified the Civil Rights division of the Department of Justice and the Department of Health, Education, and Welfare of situation going on in Texas. Texans for the Educational Advancement of Mexican Americans (TEAMA) provided the striking students with instruction during the Christmas holidays.

The school board finally agreed to a hearing, and on January 9, 1970, student demands were approved. This victory energized the community and that spring, "Mexican American candidates swept the school board and city council elections."

Within two years, the faculty of the school, as well as administrators and the superintendent, reflected the Mexican American majority of the population. The school had an increase in graduating students and a majority of the students were attending some form of higher education. Some of the student leaders of the walkout have gone on to hold key positions at the school and in government.

La Raza Unida Party
By the late 1960s, Crystal City  became the location of continued activism in the civil rights movement among its Mexican American majority population, and the birthplace of the third-party political movement known as La Raza Unida Party founded by three Chicanos, including José Ángel Gutiérrez over a conflict about the ethnicity of cheerleaders at Crystal City High School. La Raza Unida, and related organizations, then won election to most offices in Crystal City and Zavala County in the periods between 1969 and 1980, when the party declined at the local level.

In the 1970s, following protests of charges (essentially nonpayment of services) on the part of La Raza Unida, Crystal City's natural gas supply was shut off by its only supplier. Crystal City residents were forced to resort to mostly wood-burning stoves and individual propane gas tanks for cooking.

1976 indictments

In 1976, 11 officials in Crystal City were indicted on various counts. Angel Noe Gonzalez, the former Crystal City Independent School District superintendent who later worked in the United States Department of Education in Washington, DC, upon his indictment retained the San Antonio lawyer and later mayor, Phil Hardberger. Gonzalez was charged with paying Adan Cantu for doing no work. Hardberger, however, documented to the court specific duties that Cantu had performed and disputed all the witnesses called against Cantu. The jury unanimously acquitted Gonzalez. Many newspapers reported on the indictments, but not on the acquittal. John Luke Hill, the 1978 Democratic gubernatorial nominee, had sought to weaken La Raza Unida so that he would not lose general election votes to a third-party candidate. Victory, however, went not to Hill, but narrowly to his successful Republican rival, Bill Clements. Compean received only 15,000 votes, or 0.6%, just under Clements's 17,000-vote plurality over Hill.

Political corruption
In February 2016, almost every top official of the city was arrested under a federal indictment accusing them of taking bribes from contractors and providing city workers to assist an illegal gambling operator, Ngoc Tri Nguyen.  Included were Mayor Ricardo Lopez, city attorney William Jonas, Mayor pro tem Rogelio Mata, council member Roel Mata, and former council member Gilbert Urrabazo.  A second councilman, Marco Rodriguez, was already charged in a separate case with smuggling Mexican immigrants. A week earlier, Lopez was taken into custody for assault and disorderly conduct during a city council meeting in which a recall election to remove two other city council members and him was discussed. In December, Jonas surrendered to authorities after being charged with assault for allegedly manhandling an elderly woman who was trying to enter a city council meeting. That left one councilman free of federal charges.

Geography
According to the United States Census Bureau, the city has a total area of 3.6 square miles (9.4 km), all of it land.  Major bodies of water near Crystal City include the Nueces River and Averhoff Reservoir. Soils are well-drained, reddish brown to grayish brown, sandy loam or clay loam of the Brystal, Pryor, and Tonio series; the Brystal is neutral to mildly alkaline and the other two tend to be moderately alkaline.

Demographics

2020 census

As of the 2020 United States census, there were 6,354 people, 2,458 households, and 2,050 families residing in the city.

2000 census
As of the census of 2000,  7,190 people, 2,183 households, and 1,781 families resided in the city. The population density was 1,974.1 people per square mile (762.7/km). The 2,500 housing units averaged 686.4 per square mile (265.2/km). The racial makeup of the city was 67.96% White, 0.67% African American, 0.39% Native American, 0.10% Asian, 0.06% Pacific Islander, 28.33% from other races, and 2.50% from two or more races. Hispanics or Latinos of any race were 94.97% of the population.

Of the 2,183 households, 43.2% had children under the age of 18 living with them, 51.9% were married couples living together, 25.1% had a female householder with no husband present, and 18.4% were not families. About 16.9% of all households were made up of individuals, and 9.7% had someone living alone who was 65 years of age or older. The average household size was 3.25 and the average family size was 3.67.

In the city, the population was distributed as 34.9% under the age of 18, 9.6% from 18 to 24, 24.2% from 25 to 44, 18.7% from 45 to 64, and 12.6% who were 65 years of age or older. The median age was 29 years. For every 100 females, there were 91.2 males. For every 100 females age 18 and over, there were 86.1 males.

The median income for a household in the city was $15,400, and for a family was $17,555. Males had a median income of $22,217 versus $14,591 for females. The per capita income for the city was $8,899. About 39.8% of families and 44.1% of the population were below the poverty line, including 51.3% of those under age 18 and 43.2% of those age 65 or over.

Economy
The Crystal City Correctional Center, a private prison, was previously one of the largest employers in the Crystal City area when it housed prisoners from a variety of jurisdictions, including federal prisoners.

Transportation
Crystal City is served by U.S. Route 83 and FM 65, FM 582, and FM 1433.

Education
Crystal City is served by the Crystal City Independent School District. The high school teams are known as the Javelinas.

Also, the area has  a branch of Southwest Texas Junior College, of which the main campus is to the north in Uvalde.

References

Further reading
 Bosworth, Allan R. (1967), America's Concentration Camps, New York:  Norton.   
Connell, Thomas. (2002). America's Japanese Hostages:  The US Plan For A Japanese Free Hemisphere.  Westport: Praeger-Greenwood. ; OCLC 606835431
 Fox, Stephen, America's Invisible Gulag, A Biography of German American Internment and Exclusion in World War II. Morehouse Pub, 2000, 379 pp.
 Miller, Michael V. "Chicano Community Control in South Texas: Problems And Prospects," Journal of Ethnic Studies (1975) 3#3 pp 70–89.
 Jensen, Richard J. and John C. Hammerback, "Radical Nationalism Among Chicanos: The Rhetoric of José Angel Gutiérrez," Western Journal of Speech Communication: WJSC (1980) 44#3 pp 191–202
 Navarro, Armando. The Cristal Experiment: A Chicano Struggle for Community Control (University of Wisconsin Press, 1998)
 Riley, Karen L. Schools behind Barbed Wire: The Untold Story of Wartime Internment and the Children of Arrested Enemy Aliens (2002).  
 Russell, Jan Jarboe (2015), The Train to Crystal City:  FDR's Secret Prisoner Exchange and America's Only Family Internment Camp during World War II, Waterville, ME:  Thorndike Press.    
 Shockley, John Staples. Chicano Revolt in a Texas Town (1974), [detailed narrative of 1960s and 1970s].

External links

 

Cities in Texas
Cities in Zavala County, Texas
County seats in Texas